Canadian doubles, similar to cutthroat tennis, is a method of playing tennis with three players. It pits two players against one player on the court at the same time. The only major rule variation between Canadian doubles and traditional doubles tennis is that the team of two players can only hit the ball within the single player's singles lines, whilst the single player can hit into the full doubles court on the two player's side. Canadian doubles is used as a training method, to work on shot-making, accuracy and teamwork.

Scoring Rules:

The single person serves till the other side gets the single player out twice. They keep their score until this point. Each serve is worth 1 point. Once they are ousted the players move counterclockwise. The first to score 11 points wins. Must win by 2 points.

See also
 Types of tennis match

References 

Forms of tennis
Doubles tennis